This is a list of states and territories of India by number of places of worship as reported by the Census 2001. Uttar Pradesh has highest number of places of worship.

List

References

India
 
Lists of subdivisions of India